Milan Madaj (born May 8, 1970) of the SK James Bobrovec is a Slovak ski mountaineer. He became a member of the SSA national squad in 1992.

Madaj was born in Liptovský Mikuláš. He started ski mountaineering in 1989 and competed first in 1991.

Selected results 
 1998:
 4th, Patrouille des Glaciers (together with Miroslav Leitner and Dušan Trizna)
 2000:
 1st: Psotkov memoriál
 2001:
 7th, European Championship team race (together with Dušan Trizna)
 2002:
 10th, World Championship team race (together with Dušan Trizna)
 2004:
 5th, World Championship relay race (together with Miroslav Leitner, Branislav Kačina and Peter Svätojánsky
 2005:
 5th, European Championship relay race (together with Peter Svätojánsky, Miroslav Leitner und Branislav Kačina)
 2006:
 4th, World Championship relay race (together with Miroslav Leitner, Milan Blaško and Peter Svätojánsky)
 2007:
 10th, European Championship relay race (together with Matúš Daňko, Jozef Hlavco and Juraj Laštík)

Pierra Menta 

 1994: 2nd, together with Dušan Trizna
 1995: 2nd, together with Dušan Trizna
 1996: 3rd, together with Dušan Trizna ("seniors I" ranking)
 1998: 8th, together with Dušan Trizna
 2000: 6th, together with Dušan Trizna
 2001: 9th, together with Dušan Trizna
 2006: 9th, together with Peter Svätojánsky

Trofeo Mezzalama 

 2003: 10th, together with Peter Svätojánsky and Miroslav Leitner

External links 
 Milan Madaj at skimountaineering.org

References 

1970 births
Living people
Slovak male ski mountaineers
People from Liptovský Mikuláš District
Sportspeople from the Žilina Region